Donald George Fleming (born November 7, 1938) is a Canadian chemist. He attended the University of British Columbia and earned a Bachelor of Science degree in 1961 and a Master of Science degree in 1961. He earned a Ph.D. at the University of California, Berkeley in 1967. He is currently a professor emeritus of chemistry at the University of British Columbia. In 1989 he published a paper theorizing a new kind of chemical bond, which he referred to as vibrational bonding. The existence of such a short-lived bond was confirmed using a reaction between bromine and the exotic atom muonium in January 2015. Fleming is also known for his work in utilizing muon beams in studies of physical chemical sciences.

References 

Living people
1938 births
Academic staff of the University of British Columbia
Canadian chemists
University of British Columbia alumni
UC Berkeley College of Chemistry alumni
Place of birth missing (living people)
University of California, Berkeley alumni